Shuibei station, is a station of Shenzhen Metro Line 3 It started operations on 28 June 2011, and it is the first station that connected with the old Shenzhen Metro Line 3 which used to terminate at Caopu.

Station layout

Exits

References

External links
 Shenzhen Metro Shuibei Station (Chinese)
 Shenzhen Metro Shuibei Station (English)

Shenzhen Metro stations
Railway stations in Guangdong
Luohu District
Railway stations in China opened in 2011